The Days of the Turbins is a 1976 Soviet three-part television drama film directed by Vladimir Basov, based on the eponymous play by Mikhail Bulgakov (the author's adaptation of his novel The White Guard for stage).

Plot
The film tells about the intelligentsia and the revolution in Russia, about the life of the family of Turbin officers during the Russian Civil War.

Kiev. Winter of 1918-1919. The power in the city passes from the Hetman to the Directorate of Ukraine, then from Petliura to the Bolsheviks. Turbins and their acquaintances have to make their choice. Colonel Alexei Turbin and his brother Nicholas remain loyal to the White Movement and bravely defend it, without worrying about their lives. Elena's (née Turbin) husband, Vladimir Talberg flees shamefully from the city with the retreating German troops. In this troubled time, the family and close friends gather and celebrate the New Year. A strange and slightly ridiculous person comes to visit them, a distant relative of the Turbins - Larion Surzhansky (Lariosik).

Cast
Andrey Myagkov — Alexei Vasilievich Turbin
Andrei Rostotsky — Nikolai Vasilievich Turbin
Valentina Titova — Elena Talberg
Oleg Basilashvili — Vladimir Robertovich Talberg
Vladimir Basov — Viktor Viktorovich Myshlaevsky
Vasily Lanovoy — Leonid Yurievich Shervinsky
Pyotr Shcherbakov — Alexander Bronislavovich Studzinsky
Sergey Ivanov — Lariosik (Larion Larionovich Surzhansky)
Viktor Chekmaryov — Vasily Ivanovich Lisovich
Margarita Krinitsyna — Vanda, wife of Lisovich
Vladimir Samoilov — Hetman Skoropadsky
Gleb Strizhenov — General von Shratt
Vadim Grachyov — von Doost
Nikolay Smorchkov — First Officer
Igor Bezyayev — Lieutenant Kopylov
Mikhail Selyutin — third officer, lieutenant
Fyodor Nikitin — Maxim
Ivan Ryzhov — footman Fedor
Dmitry Orlovsky — the postman
Boryslav Brondukov — the Bolshevik agitator
Leo Perfilov — city dweller

See also
The White Guard, a Russian 2012 TV series.

References

External links
 

1976 drama films
1976 films
Soviet television films
Mosfilm films
Films based on works by Mikhail Bulgakov
Films directed by Vladimir Basov